Ace the Case is a 2016 family mystery film written, produced and directed by Kevin Kaufman and starring Ripley Sobo,
Lev Gorn, Susan Sarandon, and Marc Menchaca.

Premise
An intrepid 10-year-old girl (Ripley Sobo) tries to help a veteran New York detective (Susan Sarandon) solve the kidnapping of a young woman (Luna Tieu).

Cast
Ripley Sobo as Olivia Haden
Susan Sarandon as Detective Dottie Wheel
Marc Menchaca as Gunner
Lev Gorn as the Surgeon
Aaron Sauter as Miles
Ivana Kane as Julia
Luca Manganaro as Stefano
Arturo Castro as Juan
Luna Tieu as Mei Wong
Johnny Tran as Shan
Ginna Le Vine as Gena
Esther Zyskind as Jill

Soundtrack
Unhappy Ending by Lindsey Cohen

Aim High by Ripley Sobo

Reception
The film has a 20% rating on Rotten Tomatoes.  Sandie Angulo Chen of Common Sense Media awarded the film two stars out of five.

References

External links
 
 

American mystery films
Films set in New York City
2010s English-language films
2010s American films